The AARP Movies for Grownups Award for Best Movie for Grownups is one of the AARP Movies for Grownups Awards presented annually by the AARP since the awards' inception in 2002. The award honors the best film in a given year made by or about people who are fifty years old or older. The Best Movie for Grownups Award is one of the seven original trophies issued by AARP the Magazine, along with awards for Best Director, Best Actor, Best Actress, Best Foreign Film, Best Documentary, and Best Movie for Grownups Who Refuse to Grow Up.

Winners and Nominees

2000s

2010s

2020s

See also
 Academy Award for Best Picture
 Golden Globe Award for Best Motion Picture – Drama
 Golden Globe Award for Best Motion Picture – Musical or Comedy
 BAFTA Award for Best Film
 Critics' Choice Movie Award for Best Acting Ensemble
 Critics' Choice Movie Award for Best Picture
 Independent Spirit Award for Best Film

References

Awards for best film
Movie for Grownups